Semasiography (from  (semasia) "signification, meaning" and  (graphia) "writing") is "writing with signs", a non-phonetic based technique to "communicate information without the necessary intercession of forms of speech." It means written symbols and languages that are not based on spoken words.  It predated the advent of the creation of the language-based writing system and is used contemporarily in computer icons, musical notation, emoji, Blissymbols and mathematical notation. It is studied in semasiology within the field of linguistics.

References